Anke Hennig (born 7 October 1964) is a German politician for the SPD and since 2021 member of the Bundestag, the federal diet.

Life and politics 

Hennig was born 1964 in the West German city of Osnabrück and was elected to the Bundestag in 2021.

References 

Living people
1964 births
Social Democratic Party of Germany politicians
Members of the Bundestag 2021–2025
21st-century German politicians
21st-century German women politicians
Female members of the Bundestag